Modibo Keita International Airport  (formerly Bamako–Sénou International Airport) is Mali's main airport located approximately  south of downtown Bamako, the capital of Mali in West Africa. It is the country's only international airport. It is managed by Aéroports du Mali (ADM). Its operations are overseen by the Malian Ministry of Equipment and Transport.

History
Bamako-Sénou Airport was opened to traffic in 1974. The airport was upgraded between 2007 and 2012 in a US$181 million project funded by the Millennium Challenge Corporation, a United States foreign aid agency.

Military base
Bamako–Sénou International Airport is adjacent to Air Base 101, which is used by the Mali Air Force.

Statistics
Passenger traffic steadily increased in the early 2000s.  Government figures show 403,380 passengers in 1999, 423,506 in 2003, 486,526 in 2004, and 516,000 in 2005.  In 2006 it was predicted to reach over 900,000 by 2015 under a low (4%) yearly growth rate scenario.

Total air traffic at BKO increased by 12.4% in 2007 and 14% in 2008.  Most of this increase came in passenger transport, with the number of passengers served increasing by 20% in 2007 and 17% in 2008. Twenty-seven airline carriers operated weekly or better at BKO in the 2007–2008 period. This continued growth was offset by cargo flights' decline of 16.75%  in 2007, and 3.93% in 2008.

Airlines and destinations

Passenger

Cargo

Accidents and incidents
On 24 July 1971, Douglas C-47A 6V-AAP of Air Ivoire crashed into a hill shortly after take-off. The aircraft was operating a scheduled passenger flight. All six people on board were killed.

References

External links

 
 A–Z World Airports: Bamako – Senou Int'l Airport (BKO/GABS)
 Aeronautical charts for BKO/GABS from ASECNA
 
 
 Avient Aviation Scheduled Flights

Airports established in 1974
Airports in Mali
Buildings and structures in Bamako
1974 establishments in Mali